James B. Ward Jr. (January 2, 1948 – April 26, 2001) was an American football coach. He served as the head football coach at the University at Buffalo from 1992 to 1994, compiling a record of 8–24.

Before coaching at Buffalo, Ward was a football coach at Northwestern High School and Howard University. Following his tenure at the University at Buffalo, Ward held multiple positions, including physical education teacher and vice principal at Seneca Vocational High School, principal of Douglass High School, and County Youth Commissioner for Erie County, New York. He resigned from that position in 2000, after he pleaded guilty to accepting unemployment benefits while he was employed by the Buffalo Public Schools system.

Ward died in 2001 from a heart attack, while attending church services at Mount Olive Baptist Church in Buffalo, New York.

Head coaching record

References

1948 births
2001 deaths
Buffalo Bulls football coaches
Howard Bison football coaches
Norfolk State Spartans  football coaches
High school football coaches in Maryland
University of Maryland Eastern Shore alumni